The Priene Synagogue is an ancient synagogue discovered by archaeologists in Priene, Turkey.

The synagogue was discovered by archaeologists Theodor Wiegand and Hans Schrader in the western residential area in 1895–98. The synagogue dates to the 2nd century CE and was built into an older Hellenistic house. It consists of a main hall with two rows of columns forming a small basilica. Only one column was still in place. However, in the 1904 excavation report they mistakenly speculated that the structure was a house church.
In 1928 archaeologist Eleazar Sukenik identified the building as a synagogue, pointing to a niche for the Torah Ark. He also noted the carved menorah  near the niche. It is known that hundreds of thousands of Jews lived in Asia Minor in the 1st century CE. Only two confirmed synagogues have been discovered: the Sardis Synagogue and this second one in Priene.

In the summer of 2009 archeologists Nadin Burkhardt from the University of Frankfurt am Main and Mark Wilson of the Asia Minor Research Center in Izmir began an exploration of the synagogue in a dig sponsored by the Biblical Archaeology Society.

References

See also
 Sardis Synagogue

Ancient synagogues
Synagogues in Turkey